Benjamin Woolley is an author, media journalist and television presenter. In 2018, he published The King's Assassin.

Biography 

Woolley studied Philosophy & Politics at Durham University, graduating in 1979. Woolley currently teaches English Literature at Goldsmiths, University of London.

Books

TV programmes 
Woolley presented Games Britannia, a documentary on the painting An Experiment on a Bird in the Air Pump for BBC Four, and an episode of The Late Show, Libraries and Civilization. Together with Martyn Ives, David H. Levy, and David Taylor, Woolley won a 1998 News & Documentary Emmy Award in the "Individual Achievement in a Craft, Writer" category for the script of the documentary 3 Minutes to Impact produced by York Films for the Discovery Channel.

References

External links
 Authors Page

Living people
British historians
Year of birth missing (living people)
Alumni of St Cuthbert's Society, Durham